For the purposes of this list, a portable application is software that can be used from portable storage devices such as USB flash drives, digital audio players, PDAs or external hard drives. To be considered for inclusion, an application must be executable on multiple computers from removable storage without installation, and without writing settings or data onto a computer's non-removable storage. This includes modified portable versions of non-portable applications.

Bundles
 Ceedo
 MojoPac
 LiberKey
 PortableApps.com
 U3
 WebLaminarTools
 WinPenPack

Launchers

 Appetizer (Dock application)
 ASuite
 Launchy
 OpenDisc
 RocketDock

Development

Scripting languages
 Portable Python
 Portable NSIS Version
 Portable AutoIt
 Portable AutoHotkey (zip file)
 Portable Perl (Strawberry Perl Portable Version)

Compilers

 MinGW
 Tiny C Compiler

IDEs

 Alice IDE
 Portable Eclipse
 Portable Code::Blocks (needs MinGW installed, which is portable too)
 Portable Dev-C++
 Hackety Hack, which is an educational version of Ruby
 SharpDevelop Portable

Setup creators
 Nullsoft Scriptable Install System Portable (PortableApps.com format)

Visual mapping/productivity tools
 XMIND

Graphics

3D modeling and rendering
 Anim8or – Free 3D modeling and animating software.
 Blender:
 BlenderPortable
 Blender Pocket
 XBlender

Animation
 Anim8or
 Blender
 Pivot Stickfigure Animator

Graphic editors
 ArtRage
 Artweaver
 Dia
 EVE
 Fotografix
 GIMP:
 GIMP Portable VS 2008 is the Gimp portable version of Gimp on Windows platforms (Windows XP, Vista, NT Server 2003, NT Server 2008)
 Portable Gimp – for Mac OS X
 X-Gimp
 X-GimpShop
 Inkscape:
 X-Inkscape
 Portable Inkscape – for Mac OS X
 IrfanView
 Pixia
 Tux Paint

Icon editors
 @icon sushi
 GIMP – Supports reading and writing Windows ICO files.
 IcoFX
 IrfanView – Supports converting graphic file formats into Windows ICO files.

Viewers
 FastStone Image Viewer: supports screen capture, multiple pix into a single PDF
 Irfanview
 XnView

Document-based

Office and publishing
 Abiword
 AllMyNotes Organizer
 Atlantis Word Processor
 Jarte
 LibreOffice
 OpenOffice.org
 Scribus
 StarOffice

Editors
 AkelPad
 EmEditor Professional
 Geany
 Metapad
 Notepad++
 Notepad2
 NoteTab Light
 PSPad
 Q10
 SciTE
 Sublime Text
 TED Notepad
 Textpad
 UltraEdit
 VEDIT
 Vim

Personal notes
 Personal Knowbase

Educational
 Celestia
 GCompris
 Maxima
 Stellarium
 Calibre

Games
 AssaultCube
 Cave Story
 Dwarf Fortress
 Doom I / II
 Frets on Fire
 Kerbal Space Program
 Minecraft
 PokerTH
 Quake
 Secret Maryo Chronicles
 Tile World
 Warzone 2100
Xonotic

Emulators
 DOSBox – MS-DOS emulator
 FCE Ultra – Nintendo Entertainment System (NES) emulator
 MAME – Multiple Arcade Machine emulator:
 MAMEUI32
 VisualBoyAdvance – Game Boy, Game Boy Color, and Game Boy Advance emulator
 ZSNES – Super NES emulator

Plug-in emulators
 JoyToKey – Gamepad emulator

Internet

Web browsers

 Avant
 Brave
 Chromium
 Falkon
 Firefox Portable
 Google Chrome Portable
 Links
 Maxthon Browser
 Opera
 Pale Moon
 Pocket K-Meleon
 Lynx
 QtWeb 
 SeaMonkey
SlimBrowser
 SRWare Iron Portable
 Sleipnir
 Waterfox
 XeroBank Browser

Email clients

 Mail – for Mac OS X
 Mozilla Thunderbird Portable
 Modest
 Pegasus Mail
 Pine
 Opera (has integrated Email client)
 SeaMonkey
 sylpheed (zip version)
 The Bat! Voyager

Instant messaging
 Adium – for Mac OS X
 aMSN
 Google Talk
 Portable iChat – for Mac OS X
 Miranda NG
 Monal
 Pidgin Portable (formerly Gaim Portable)
 Psi Portable
 Skype
 Trillian Anywhere
 Yahoo! Messenger

FTP clients
 WinSCP
 FileZilla
 Portable Cyberduck
 SmartFTP
 FlashFXP

Download managers
 
 Wget
 HTTrack

 Free Download Manager (installation required to create portable version)
 Opera (Integrated Download Manager)

P2P file sharing
 BitComet (needs msxml)
 Emule
 Opera (integrated torrent client)
 μTorrent (latest version)
 Halite
 FrostWire
 Limewire Portable
 qBittorrent Portable
 Vuze Portable

IRC
 ChatZilla Note: Requires a Mozilla based browser, e.g. SeaMonkey, or Firefox.
 Miranda NG
 mIRC Note: There is a U3 version of mIRC that can be installed on U3 drives. The original application is portable, leaving behind only the license key in the registry. (This may not be true with the newer versions that are Vista-compatible, as their default user data area was changed to the user's application data folder.) Since v3.1, it can be started from a command line using the -portable switch to use settings, DLLs, and license keys that are stored in the same folder as mirc.exe.
 Nettalk
 Pidgin (formerly Gaim)
 Opera (Integrated Irc client)
 HexChat
 Portable X-Chat Aqua – for Mac OS X

RSS, Atom readers
 RSSOwl (needs Java runtime environment)
 Opera (Integrated RSS/Atom client)

Telnet, SSH clients
 portaPuTTY
 WinSCP Portable Edition – SFTP/SCP/FTP client, remote file manager, GUI

Podcast managers
 Juice

Anonymity/Anti-censorship
 Tor Browser Bundle

Local wikis
 EverNote
 TiddlyWiki
 DokuWiki

Miscellaneous
 Ahnenblatt multilingual Genealogy software
 Moka5 LivePC Engine (Portable VMware). Dynamically loads and unloads network drivers and requires administrator rights.
 Mojopac portable chopped down copy of windows. Requires administrator rights.

Multimedia

File converters
 Any Video Converter
 Audiograbber
 CDex
 FormatFactory
 fre:ac
 MediaCoder
 TMPGEnc
 XMedia Recode

CD/DVD burning
 CDBurnerXP
 DVDStyler
 DeepBurner Portable Edition
 InfraRecorder
 Portable ImgBurn

Editors
 Portable Audacity – for Windows and Mac OS X
 mp3DirectCut
 GoldWave
 VirtualDub

Audio/MIDI sequencer
 Reaper has a .bat file for a USB stick installation

Players
 RealPlayer
 FLV player
 Media Player Classic
 foobar2000 – only supports xp and forward
 MPlayer
 SMPlayer (7zip version)
 Songbird
 K-Multimedia Player (zip version)
 The Core Pocket Media Player
 VLC Media Player
 Winamp

Recorders
 Streamripper

Video capture
 VirtualDub

Video repair
 Stellar Phoenix Video Repair

Networking

HTTP servers
 HFS
 Node.js
 XAMPP

Miscellaneous
 Netcat
 Proxomitron – Filtering Web Proxy
 Xming
 Wireshark
 RealVNC

Remote desktop
 AnyDesk
 RealVNC
 TeamViewer
 TightVNC
 UltraVNC

Other tools

Web editors

 Portable Nvu and KompoZer – for Mac OS X and Windows.
 OpenOffice.org Portable – Complete office suite, which includes HTML editor.
 SeaMonkey

Calendar management

 Portable Sunbird – for Mac OS X, and Windows
 Portable iCal – for Mac OS X

File management

 Directory Opus by selecting the USB/U3 export option
 Servant Salamander 1.52
 Total Commander
 X-file X-file for Windows 98SE/2K or later
 XYplorer

File archivers/extractors

 7-Zip
 Filzip
 PeaZip, for BSD, Linux and Windows
 WinRAR, Portable version for Windows, still requires having a license for a regular version of WinRAR. The version number for WinRAR Unplugged is 3.8.0.1, while the latest WinRAR for Windows version is 4.11

PDF tools

Readers

 Foxit Reader
 STDU Viewer
 Sumatra PDF
 PDF-XChange Viewer

Writers

 Portable OpenOffice.org – for Microsoft Windows and Mac OS X

Security and encryption

Password management
 KeePass Portable
 Password Safe

Anti-spyware/malware
 Combofix
 HijackThis
 Spybot – Search & Destroy
 SUPERAntiSpyware

Antivirus
 ClamWin Portable
 GMER
 Sophos Anti Rootkit Tool

Steganography
 OpenPuff

Real-time disk/volume Encryption
 FreeOTFE / FreeOTFE Explorer

System maintenance

Optimization and cleaning
 CCleaner

Storage management
Visual maps of free space and biggest files and folders on hard drive.
 WinDirStat
 Defraggler

System information
 CPU-Z – CPU and memory hardware details – clock and FSB speeds, SPD, OS version.
 AIDA32 – freeware system information, diagnostics, and auditing program
 Speccy – System information tool.

Partition/file recovery
 Stellar Phoenix Photo Recovery
 PhotoRec
 Stellar Phoenix Windows Data Recovery
 Stellar Phoenix Mac Data Recovery
 TestDisk
 Recuva – has U3 variant.

See also
 Portable Application
 List of LiveDistros
 Live USB
 Portable application creators
 VMware ThinApp, a virtualization suite (with the ability to make portable programs)
 Windows To Go

References

Portable software
Portable software